Polygamous marriages are not legally recognized in Mongolia. According to news.china.com, some Mongolian newspapers in 2005 discussed whether Mongolia should legalize polygamous unions. Proponents of such unions argued that the legislation would help reduce the imbalance of the male and female population.

References

Society of Mongolia
Mongolia